Eubranchus amazighi is a species of sea slug or nudibranch, a marine gastropod mollusc in the family Eubranchidae.

Distribution
This species was described from Agadir Harbour , Agadir, Morocco.

References

Eubranchidae
Gastropods described in 2015